Wayne Randazzo (born ) is an American sportscaster. He is currently the television play-by-play announcer for the Los Angeles Angels, beginning with the 2023 season.

Early life and education
Randazzo was born in Chicago and attended St. Charles East High School in St. Charles, Illinois. He earned his undergraduate degree at North Central College in Naperville, Illinois. He is the cousin of current Major League Baseball umpire Tony Randazzo.

Career
Randazzo called Kane County Cougars games from 2012 to 2014. Randazzo called college baseball and softball for the Big Ten Network and provided sports commentary on WSCR and WBBM in Chicago, as well as broadcasting games for the Chicago White Sox and Chicago Sky. In 2015, Randazzo was named the host of the New York Mets pre- and post-game shows, then on WOR. Randazzo became the regular play-by-play broadcast partner of Howie Rose for the 2019 season with the departure of Josh Lewin. On September 23, 2022, filling in on Apple TV+'s Friday Night Baseball broadcast, he called Albert Pujols's 700th home run in a game between the St. Louis Cardinals and Los Angeles Dodgers. He departed WCBS after four seasons in December 2022 and on January 3, 2023 Bally Sports West confirmed he would become the television play-by-play announcer for the Los Angeles Angels. He will continue calling games for Apple TV+.

References

External links

New York Mets profile

1984 births
American radio sports announcers
Living people
Major League Baseball broadcasters
New York Mets announcers
Chicago White Sox announcers
Chicago Sky announcers
High school football announcers in the United States
High school basketball announcers in the United States
Baseball announcers
College basketball announcers in the United States
North Central College alumni
People from St. Charles, Illinois
People from Chicago